Menegazzia capitata is a species of foliose lichen from Southeast Asia.

See also
List of Menegazzia species

References

capitata
Lichen species
Lichens described in 2007
Lichens of Asia
Taxa named by Harrie Sipman